Glasgow North East is a burgh constituency of the House of Commons of the Parliament of the United Kingdom (at Westminster). It was first contested at the 2005 general election. The current Member of Parliament (MP) is Anne McLaughlin of the SNP who won the seat back from Labour's Paul Sweeney at the 2019 general election.

History
From the seat's creation until 2009, the constituency was represented by Michael Martin, previously MP for Glasgow Springburn from 1979. Martin was elected Speaker of the House of Commons in October 2000, but in May 2009 he announced that he would be resigning as Speaker on 21 June 2009 because of his perceived role in the MPs' expenses controversy. He was the first Speaker in 300 years to be forced out of office by a motion of no confidence. He also resigned as an MP the following day, resulting in a by-election on 12 November 2009, which was won by Willie Bain of the Labour Party with 59% of the vote.

Bain retained the seat the following year at the 2010 UK general election, but was defeated by Anne McLaughlin of the SNP in 2015. The seat was regained for Labour by Paul Sweeney in the snap election of 2017, only to be lost again to McLaughlin and the SNP in the 2019 election.

Boundaries

The constituency contains two Glasgow City Council wards in full: Dennistoun and Springburn & Robroyston; and also partially covers Canal, Calton, East Centre and North East wards.

The constituency partially overlaps with two Scottish Parliament seats: Glasgow Maryhill and Springburn and Glasgow Provan.

Glasgow North East is one of seven constituencies covering the Glasgow City council area. All are entirely within the council area.

Prior to the 2005 general election, the city area was covered by ten constituencies, two of which straddled the boundaries of other council areas. The North East constituency includes most of the former Glasgow Springburn constituency and a small part of the former Glasgow Maryhill constituency.

Constituency profile 
The population of the constituency was 88,156 at the time of the 2011 UK Census. It comprises the communities of Ruchill, Hamiltonhill, Possilpark, Port Dundas, Sighthill, Lambhill, Colston, Milton, Springburn, Royston, Balornock, Barmulloch, Blackhill, Blochairn, Dennistoun, Germiston, Haghill, Carntyne, Robroyston, Provanmill, Riddrie, Hogganfield, Millerston and Ruchazie.

Voting pattern
Glasgow North East and its predecessor constituencies had been represented by MPs from the Labour Party with large majorities from the 1935 general election until 2015, when the seat was gained by the SNP during their landslide victory on the largest swing recorded at the general election that year of 39.3% from Labour to SNP. At the following election held just two years later, the seat was regained on a 12% swing by Labour's Paul Sweeney with a narrow majority of 242 votes (0.7%). However, the SNP regained the constituency with a marginal majority of 7% in 2019.

According to the British Election Study, it is the most left-wing seat in the country.

It had the lowest turnout of any seat at the 2017 United Kingdom general election.

Members of Parliament

Election results

Elections in the 2010s 

This was the largest swing of any UK constituency in the 2015 election.

Elections in the 2000s 
A by-election was held in November 2009, caused by the resignation of former Speaker of the House of Commons Michael Martin. Labour won fairly comfortably, compared to the surprising SNP win in the neighbouring constituency of Glasgow East in the previous year. The turnout was the lowest in Scottish history.

1 Michael Martin stood as 'the Speaker seeking re-election'. The Speaker is elected by the House of Commons after each General Election.

As is conventional, Michael Martin (a member of the Labour Party when first elected Speaker) stood as Speaker of the House of Commons in the general election of 2005. The Conservatives and the Liberal Democrats did not stand against him. Other parties did, including the Scottish National Party (the Constitution of which requires that the party fight every seat in Scotland).

The most notable feature of the result was the relatively large vote for Arthur Scargill's Socialist Labour Party, in an area where it had very little base. This was considered to be a result of voter confusion (and not the first recorded example of its kind). A large number of traditional Labour Party voters may have voted for the Socialist Labour Party in the absence of a named Labour Party candidate on the ballot paper.

See also 
 Politics of Glasgow

References

♯ This reference gives all recent Glasgow City Westminster election results. You select the year and then the constituency to view the result.

Westminster Parliamentary constituencies in Scotland
Constituencies of the Parliament of the United Kingdom established in 2005
Politics of Glasgow
Springburn